George Errington of Hurst Castle – from the minor gentry branch of Bingfield, St John Lee, Northumberland – was an English Roman Catholic layman who is honoured as a martyr by the Catholic Church.

Errington was convicted of attempted conversion to the Catholic Church, in a plot by an Anglican minister who claimed interest in this. Convicted of treason for this under the Penal Laws enacted under Queen Elizabeth I, he was condemned to death. For this he suffered hanging, drawing and quartering at York on 29 November 1596. Two years before his own death, Errington had ridden with John Boste on his last journey from York to Durham.

Martyred with Errington were Henry Abbot, William Knight and William Gibson, who had all been caught up in the plot by the minister. Except for Abbot who was executed and beatified separately, they were all beatified by Pope John Paul II as among the Eighty-five martyrs of England and Wales.

References

1596 deaths
People executed under Elizabeth I by hanging, drawing and quartering
People executed under the Tudors for treason against England
English beatified people
16th-century Roman Catholic martyrs
Eighty-five martyrs of England and Wales
16th-century venerated Christians
Year of birth unknown
Executed people from Hampshire
People from Milford on Sea